"Look to the Rainbow" is a song written by Burton Lane and Yip Harburg for the musical Finian's Rainbow, where it was introduced by Ella Logan, and was the title song for:

 Look to the Rainbow (Astrud Gilberto album), released in 1966
 Look to the Rainbow (Al Jarreau album), released in 1977